Lucien Stephen Kempf Sr. (December 26, 1905 – September 10, 1998) was an American football coach. He served as the first head football coach in the history of Wagner College in Staten Island, New York.

Head coaching record

References

External links
 

1905 births
1998 deaths
Wagner Seahawks football coaches